Anel Karabeg (born 7 March 1962) is a Bosnian professional football manager and former player who is currently working as an assistant manager of Croatian First Football League club HNK Šibenik.

Club career
His playing career started in the 1980s and lasted until 2001. Karabeg played mostly in the midfield and his duty was providing quality passes for the strikers.

Honours

Player
Velež Mostar 
Yugoslav Cup: 1980–81, 1985–86
Balkans Cup: 1980–81

Real Burgos
Segunda División: 1989–90

External links

1962 births
Living people
Sportspeople from Mostar
Association football midfielders
Yugoslav footballers
Bosnia and Herzegovina footballers
FK Velež Mostar players
Real Burgos CF footballers
SD Eibar footballers
NK Zadar players
NK Zagreb players
HNK Šibenik players
NK Osijek players
Yugoslav First League players
Segunda División players
Croatian Football League players
Yugoslav expatriate footballers
Bosnia and Herzegovina expatriate footballers
Expatriate footballers in Spain 
Yugoslav expatriate sportspeople in Spain
Expatriate footballers in Croatia
Bosnia and Herzegovina expatriate sportspeople in Croatia
Bosnia and Herzegovina football managers
HNK Šibenik managers
FK Velež Mostar managers
Al Dhafra FC managers
Croatian Football League managers
Premier League of Bosnia and Herzegovina managers
UAE Pro League managers
Expatriate football managers in Croatia
Expatriate football managers in the United Arab Emirates
Bosnia and Herzegovina expatriate sportspeople in the United Arab Emirates